Arsenal Fest is a summer music festival held in Kragujevac, Serbia. It is staged annually since 2011 and occurs for three days every late June.

History
When it started in 2011, the festival had only a single stage. The next year, 2012. the festival got its second stage – "Zastavina bašta", later renamed as "Garden Stage". The third one, "Red Bull Stage" was put in use in 2013, but renamed next year as "Explosive DJ Stage".

In 2011, the festival had 14,000 visitors. In 2012, it was visited by 15,000 people. In 2013 and 2014 it was visited by approximately 25,000 people.

The visitors of Arsenal Fest with tickets also have a possibility of having accommodation in the festival camp named "Arsenal Rock Camp" which is situated near the main city stadium “Čika Dača”.

Location
It is held in the historical place where the Serbian industry revolution has started in the mid-19th century by opening a gun factory which later led to opening automotive facility Zastava Automobiles. The festival is famous for offering extraordinary mixture of modern sound and light systems and specific 19th century industrial architecture. The location of Arsenal Fest is a huge advantage of the festival, because it is situated just a few hundred meters from the downtown Kragujevac, but is, at the same time, completely isolated from the tumult of the city that has 175,000 residents.

Festival by year

Notes and references

See also
 List of electronic music festivals

External links
 
 

Culture in Kragujevac
Electronic music festivals in Serbia
Music festivals established in 2011
Rock festivals in Serbia
Summer events in Serbia